Grevillea banksii, commonly known as Banks' grevillea, Byfield waratah, red flowered silky oak and dwarf silky oak, and in Hawaii as kāhili flower, is a species of flowering plant in the family Proteaceae and is endemic to Queensland. It is an erect shrub or slender tree with divided leaves with four to twelve narrow lobes, and creamy white to bright scarlet and yellow flowers.

Description

Taxonomy
Grevillea banksii was first formally described in 1810 by the botanist Robert Brown in Transactions of the Linnean Society of London. The specific epithet (banksii) honours Sir Joseph Banks.

Distribution and habitat
Banks' grevillea is mostly found on the Queensland coast from Ipswich to Yeppoon, but sometimes further inland. It mostly grows in woodland and forest, usually in flatter places.

The species has also been introduced to Hawai'i and is an important woody weed in eastern Madagascar where it was introduced, with Acacia dealbata, for erosion control.

Use in horticulture
Grevillea banksii is one of the most widely cultivated grevilleas and is a parent of hybrids including G. 'Robyn Gordon' and [[Grevillea 'Superb'|G. 'Superb']],  G. 'Misty Pink', G. 'Pink Surprise', and G. 'Ned Kelly'.

 Toxicity and allergic reactions 
The flowers and seed pods contain toxic hydrogen cyanide.  The alkyl resorcinols in G. banksii and Grevillea'' 'Robyn Gordon' are responsible for contact dermatitis.

References

banksii
Proteales of Australia
Flora of Queensland
Garden plants of Australia
Contact dermatitis